Byblis is a small genus of carnivorous plants, sometimes termed the rainbow plants for the attractive appearance of their mucilage-covered leaves in bright sunshine. Native to Australia and New Guinea, it is the only genus in the family Byblidaceae. The first species in the genus was described by the English botanist Richard Anthony Salisbury in 1808. Eight species are now recognized (see below).

Byblis species look very similar to Drosera and Drosophyllum, but are distinguished by their zygomorphic flowers, with five curved stamens off to one side of the pistil. These genera are in fact not closely related; modern classifications place Byblis in the Lamiales, while the sundews and Drosophyllum are now placed in the Caryophyllales.

Plant characteristics
All species of the genus form upright growth supported by a weak, fibrous root system. The genus can be divided into two groups or "complexes": The B. liniflora complex and the B. gigantea complex (see below).

Leaves
The leaves of all species are round in cross section and highly elongated, tapering at the end. The surface of the leaves is densely studded with glandular hairs which secrete a mucilaginous substance from their tip. These serve to attract small insects, which upon touching the sticky secretions are ensnared. Unless they are strong enough to escape, the insect prey either die of exhaustion or asphyxiate as the mucilage envelops them and clogs their spiracles. Unlike the sundews, however, Byblis can move neither their tentacles nor the leaves themselves to aid trapping or digestion. As a result, they are grouped among the "passive flypaper traps" along with Pinguicula, Drosophyllum, Roridula, Stylidium and Triphyophyllum peltatum.

Along with the stalked mucilaginous glands, the leaves are also equipped with sessile glands, which assumedly are responsible for the secretion of the digestive juices. Sessile glands are five to ten times as numerous as the stalked glands.

Flowers
Flowers in this genus are borne singly at the end of unbranching, leaf-like inflorescences which emerge from the leaf axils. The five-petaled flowers are generally purple to pale violet, though B. gigantea and B. filifolia can sometimes produce white flowers. Except for the self-fertile B. liniflora, all species require pollen from other individuals for fertilization. The pollen release of B. gigantea and B. lamellata is only triggered by the resonance frequency of the wings of a landing pollinator, helping ensure cross-pollination with other individuals.  The flowers of Byblis start to bloom in early spring and last until late summer.

Fruit and seeds
Fertilized flowers mature to form an egg-shaped, two-parted seed capsule. As the seed capsule dries out it cracks open (dehisces), dropping the seed on the ground (see gravity dispersal). The black seeds are generally round and often bear webbed surface markings, although those of B. lamellata are strongly ridged (see ). The germination of many species is brought on by bush fires after the dry period; pyrogenic chemicals in the smoke are responsible for triggering germination.

Distribution and habitat

All Byblis species are native to Australia. B. gigantea and B. lamellata are endemic to the Perth region of southwest Australia, while the species making up the B. liniflora complex are found only in north Australia. The exception here is B. liniflora itself, whose distribution extends into southern Indonesia and Papua New Guinea.

Like many carnivorous plants, Byblis species usually grow in bogs and marshes. They generally prefer seasonally wet sandy soil in partial or direct sunlight with temperatures between ~ 5-40 °C (40-105 °F).

Environmental status
As native plants of Australia, all Byblis species are protected. Until the year 2000, they were also given international protection under CITES appendix II, but were removed from the list when Australia entered the CITES agreement. Since then trade of the genus has been unregulated outside of Australia. However, due to the sensitivity of the plant, interest in the genus has been restricted to a small portion of the carnivorous plant hobbyist community. The majority of plant material sold today is produced in cultivation, with the annual B. filifolia and B. liniflora being the most common. Most of the other species must be grown from seed, which is often collected from the wild for this purpose.

The West Australian species B. gigantea und B. lamellata are being threatened by habitat destruction for urban sprawl from cities such as Perth. Particularly damaging is the draining of wet habitats to produce arable land. B. gigantea is on the International Union for Conservation of Nature's Red List of Threatened Species and is considered critically endangered.

Carnivorous or protocarnivorous
The status of the genus as a truly carnivorous plant has been repeatedly put into question. In their natural habitat, all species have been observed playing host to live bugs of the genus Setocoris, which nourished themselves by eating prey caught by the plants. Following this discovery it was assumed that, as with the genus Roridula, the plants do not actually digest their prey themselves, rather relying on the bugs to do that. The plants, it was reasoned, benefited by absorbing nutrients from the excrements of the bugs, either through their leaves or through the ground. An indirect digestion of these nutrients by a chitinase producing fungus was even proposed. It was not until 2005 that direct digestion of insect prey by enzymes secreted by the sessile glands of B. filifolia was proven. Soon thereafter similar results were found with B. liniflora. These results clearly place this genus among the true carnivorous plants.

Systematics 
Molecular genetics studies have placed the genus in the order Lamiales. While its placement within the order is still unclear, it is closely related to Martyniaceae, Lentibulariaceae as well as Gesneriaceae.

For a time, the genus Roridula was also assigned to the family Byblidaceae. Since that time, however, it has been placed into its own family, Roridulaceae.

Traditionally the genus was divided into only two species, namely B. gigantea and B. liniflora. Further species were described in the 1980s, particularly through the work of the Australian botanist Allen Lowrie. Eight species are currently recognized:

 Byblis guehoi
 Byblis pilbarana

Subdivision of the genus

Byblis liniflora complex
These species grow from seedlings to flowering plants in only a few months, setting seed and dying with the onset of the dry season. The original haploid chromosome count of this complex is x=8. The diploid number is therefore 2n=16, whereas the tetraploid species B. liniflora is 2n=32.

Byblis gigantea complex 
The remaining two species, B. lamellata und B. gigantea, make up what is known as the B. gigantea complex. Unlike the annual members of the B. liniflora complex, these species survive the dry season by dying back to an underground rhizome, out of which they emerge come fall. The leaves of this complex can reach  in length. The base chromosome count of the complex is x=9; since both species are diploid, their chromosome count is 2n=18.

Paleobotany
In the year 2004 a single fossil of a seed, resembling that of members of the modern day B. liniflora complex, was discovered in south Australia dating from the middle of the Eocene epoch. The species was assigned to the Byblidaceae as a parataxon of the genus. The sole specimen was unfortunately destroyed in a lab accident shortly after being photographed.

Etymology
The Latin generic name "Byblis" originates from a goddess from Greek mythology, of whom Ovid wrote in his Metamorphoses (IX, l. 454–664). Byblis, niece of Apollo, fell deeply in love with her twin brother Caunus. At his rejection of her advances, she let forth an endless stream of glistening tears, eventually literally transforming into a spring. The droplets lining the leaves of the Byblis are said to resemble those tears.

The English vernacular name - "rainbow plants" - also denotes the mucilaginous droplets which, under the right lighting conditions and viewing angle, sparkle in a rainbow of colors.

See also
 Carnivorous plants of Australia

References
Much of the content of this article comes from the equivalent German-language Wikipedia article (retrieved 1 December 2006).

 Barthlott, Wilhelm; Porembski, Stefan; Seine, Rüdiger; Theisen, Inge: Karnivoren, Stuttgart, 2004, 
 Lowrie, Allen: Carnivorous Plants of Australia - Vol. 3, Nedlands, Western Australia, 1998
 Lowrie, Allen; Conran, John G.: A Taxonomic Revision of the Genus Byblis (Byblidaceae) In Northern Australia, Nuytsia 12(1):59-74, 1998
 Lowrie, Allen; Conran, John G.; Moyle-Croft, Jessica: A Revision of Byblis (Byblidaceae) In South-Western Australia, Nuytsia 15(1):11-19, 2002
 Conran, John G.; Houben, Andreas; Lowrie, Allen: Chromosome numbers in Byblidaceae, Aust. J. Bot., 2002, 50, 583-586
 Hartmeyer, Siegfried: Carnivory of Byblis Revisited—A Simple Method for Enzyme Testing on Carnivorous Plants, Carnivorous Plant Newsletter, 26, 39–45, 1997
 Hartmeyer, Siegfried: Carnivory in Byblis Revisited II: The Phenomenon of Symbiosis on Insect Trapping Plants, Carnivorous Plant Newsletter, 27, 110–113, 1998
Plachno, B. J.; Jankun, A.: Phosphatase Activity in Glandular Structures of Carnivorous Plant Traps., Internationaler Botanischer Kongress 2005 in Wien, P1716, The Jagiellonian Univ., Inst. of Botany, Dept. of Plant Cytology and Embryology, Kraków,Poland.

Further reading
 Conran, John G.: The embryology and relationships of the Byblidaceae, Australian Syst. Bot. 9, 243–254, 1996
 Conran, John G.; Carolin, R.: Byblidaceae, in: Kadereit, J. (ed.): The Families and Genera of Vascular Plants, Vol. VII: Flowering Plants: Dicotyledons: Lamiales (except Acanthaceae including Avicenniaceae), Springer, 2004, 45–49.
 Fukushima, K., K. Imamura, K. Nagano & Y. Hoshi (2011).  Journal of Plant Research 124(2): 231–244.

External links 

 Carnivorous Plant FAQ on Byblis
 Cultivation notes
The family Byblidaceae at the Angiosperm Phylogeny Website
 The family Byblidaceae in Delta.
 Photos of Byblis in the wild
 Botanical Society of America, Byblis - the Rainbow Plants 

 
Lamiales genera
Australasian realm flora